Meddon Green is a 1.7 hectare (ha) Local Nature Reserve, located at Meddon, near Bideford in Devon. It consists of culm grassland surrounded by hazel coppice. The reserve is owned by Hartland Parish Council and was declared in 2007. The site contains many typical culm grassland plants including Southern Marsh Orchid and Greater Bird's-foot Trefoil.

Volunteers have cleared much willow scrub from the site prior to getting the site fenced and grazed (planned for 2009).

See also 
Meddon Moor

References

External links 

Local Nature Reserves in Devon
North Devon